Francesco Durante (31 March 1684 – 30 September 1755) was a Neapolitan composer.

Biography
He was born at Frattamaggiore, in the Kingdom of Naples, and at an early age he entered the Conservatorio dei poveri di Gesù Cristo, in Naples, where he received lessons from Gaetano Greco.  Later he became a pupil of Alessandro Scarlatti at the Conservatorio di Sant'Onofrio. He is also supposed to have studied under Bernardo Pasquini and Giuseppe Ottavio Pitoni in Rome, but there is no documentary evidence. He is said to have succeeded Scarlatti in 1725 at Sant' Onofrio, and to have remained there until 1742, when he succeeded Porpora as head of the Conservatorio di Santa Maria di Loreto, also in Naples. This post he held for thirteen years, till his death in Naples. He was married three times.

His fame as a teacher was considerable, and Niccolò Jommelli, Giovanni Paisiello, Giovanni Battista Pergolesi, Niccolò Piccinni and Leonardo Vinci were amongst his pupils. As a teacher, he insisted on the unreasoning observance of rules, differing thus from Scarlatti, who treated all his pupils as individuals.

A complete collection of Durante's works, consisting almost exclusively of sacred music, was presented by Gaspare Selvaggi, a Neapolitan art collector and music theorist, to the Bibliothèque Nationale, Paris. A catalogue may be found in Fétis's Biographie universelle. The imperial library of Vienna also preserves a valuable collection of Durante's manuscripts. Two requiems, several masses (one of which, a most original work, is the Pastoral Mass for four voices) and the Lamentations of the prophet Jeremiah are amongst his most important settings. His Magnificat achieved popularity partly because of its misattribution to Pergolesi.

The fact that Durante never composed for the stage brought him an exaggerated reputation as a composer of sacred music. Considered one of the best church composers of his style and period, he seems to have founded the sentimental school of Italian church music. Nevertheless, Hasse protested against Durante's being described as the greatest harmonist of Italy, a title which he ascribed to Alessandro Scarlatti.

Discography
Solfèges d'Italie, No. 137: "Danza, danza, fanciulla gentile", with Frederica von Stade (mezzo-soprano) and Martin Katz (piano), CBS, 1982

Media

References

Sources
Sadie, S. (ed.) (1980) The New Grove Dictionary of Music & Musicians, [vol #5].
Peter van Tour: Counterpoint and Partimento: Methods of Teaching Composition in Late Eighteenth-Century Naples. 2015. 318p. (Studia musicologica Upsaliensia, 0081-6744 ; 25)  .

External links

Istituto Internazionale per lo studio del '700 musicale napoletano

1684 births
1755 deaths
18th-century Italian male musicians
18th-century Italian composers
Italian Baroque composers
Italian male classical composers
Neapolitan school composers
People from the Province of Naples
Pupils of Bernardo Pasquini
Pupils of Alessandro Scarlatti
17th-century male musicians